Zanaida is a three-act opera with music by Johann Christian Bach and libretto by Giovanni Gualberto Bottarelli. It debuted in London on 7 May 1763.

Recording
Zanaïda Live recording. Conductor: David Stern, Ensemble: Opera Fuoco, Label: ZigZag, Date: November 2012

References 

Operas by Johann Christian Bach
Italian-language operas
1763 operas